Ryan Sypek (born August 6, 1982) is an American actor and real estate broker.

Acting career
He started acting when he was in the sixth grade and also enjoyed playing baseball.  He attended Wayland High School, graduating in 2000. After high school graduation, he attended Boston University, spending a semester in London at the London Academy of Music and Dramatic Art. He graduated from Boston University with a Bachelor of Fine Arts Degree. Before getting his role on Wildfire, he worked for the famous Beverly Hills Hotel, parking cars. 

He played Jack Hunter in The Rose Tattoo at the Huntington Theatre in Boston in 2002. He co-starred in the ABC Family Original TV Series Wildfire, portraying Junior Davis, after initially auditioning for the role of Matt Ritter. He portrayed Sgt. Mills Evans in Private Valentine: Blonde & Dangerous, starring opposite Jessica Simpson. He was also a guest star on an episode of another popular ABC Family show, Greek, as a suitor for the lead character, Casey and as Dylan Boyd in Hollywood Heights.

Filmography

Wildfire (2005–2008) - Junior Davis
Private Valentine: Blonde & Dangerous (2008) - Sgt. Mills Evans
Greek (2008), episode: "A Tale of Two Parties" - Ryan Prince
How I Met Your Mother (2009), episode: "Mosbius Designs" - PJ
Christmas Cupid (2010) - Jason
Squatters (Online TV) (2010), 3 episodes - Robert
Happy Endings (2011) - Todd
The Nine Lives of Chloe King (2011), episode: "All Apologies"  - Jesse
My Super Psycho Sweet 16: Part 3 (2012)- Nathan Stillo
The Secret Life of the American Teenager (2012)- Police Officer
Hollywood Heights (2012)-Dylan Boyd
Dads (2014) - Colt

References

External links
 

1982 births
Boston University College of Fine Arts alumni
Living people